Boxen may refer to: 
 Boxen (C. S. Lewis), a fictional land developed by C. S. Lewis and his brother Warren Lewis in their childhood
 Boxen Island, Tasmania, Australia
 Jyske Bank Boxen, informally just called Boxen, large indoor arena in Herning, Denmark
 Boxen (album), 1998 box set by Swedish punk band Ebba Grön